Faithless 2.0 is a remix album by British electronica band Faithless. It features remixes of many of their previous songs, as mixed by Avicii, Eric Prydz and Armin van Buuren. It was released in 2015, five years after their sixth album, The Dance. 2.0 was followed up with Faithless' seventh studio album, All Blessed in 2020.

Chart performance
The album debuted at number 1 on the UK Albums Chart after selling 12,098 copies, the second-lowest for a UK number-one album in the 21st century, beaten only by Rihanna's album Talk That Talk, which sold just 9,578 copies when it returned to number one in August 2012.

Track listing

Charts

Weekly charts

Year-end charts

References

2015 albums
Albums produced by Rollo Armstrong
Faithless albums